The weightlifting competition at the 2010 Summer Youth Olympics took place in Singapore in the Toa Payoh Sports Hall from 15–19 August.

Event Summary

Medal table

Women's events

Men's events

Events Schedule
All events are scheduled to be 2 hours long.
Events include the main competition (approx. 1:50 hours) and the awards ceremony (approx. 0:10 hours).

Qualified Athletes

Women's

Men's

References
Competition Schedule
Athlete/Event List 

 
2010 Summer Youth Olympics events
Youth Olympics
2010
Weightlifting in Singapore